Government Degree College Sopore is an educational institution located in the town of Sopore in the Baramulla District of Jammu and Kashmir, India. The college was established in 1951 to provide higher education to the students of the area. It is one of the oldest institutes in the valley of Kashmir and is National Assessment and Accreditation Council (NAAC) accredited.

History 
Government Degree College, Sopore Kashmir was established as an intermediate college in 1949, then housed in present Boys Higher Secondary Institute Sopore with Late Prof. Mufti Jalal-ud-din as its first principal. The foundation stone of the college was formally laid down by the Prime Minister Hon’ble Late Sheikh Muhammad Abdullah on 27 September 1951 starting with a meager roll of 50 odd students in 1951. The institution has presently 5500 students on rolls, with about 2500 girl students making it the biggest multi-disciplinary co-education institution of the valley.

In 1970 it became affiliated with the University of Kashmir.

The college emblem is “Minnaz Zulumati illan Noor” (English: “from darkness to light”).

Funding is provided by the state government. The college faculty includes are 31 permanent teachers, 4 of whom have their M.Phils. and 8 have their Ph.Ds. Of the 31, 19 are men and 12 are women. Additionally, the college contracts from a pool of 60 teachers to meet any staff shortage needs. The college has one main building. The other buildings are geo science building, commerce and management studies building, laboratory building. The college has also a library, with a reading room where students read newspapers, magazines etc. There is also a decorated auditorium.

Campus
Since 1951, college has developed into a multi-faculty institution with faculty of Arts, Science, Commerce and Management and Computer Applications, all manned by academicians with considerable potential, research and teaching experience.

This college is housing IGNOU Study Centre since January, 2000 that provides platform for providing education to large segment of population through distance mode.

Greenhouse, Fern-house and Herbal Garden are to be installed in the presently existing Botanical Garden. Solar Park for college, fair price shop equipped with stationery items and fast food facilities are coming up in the campus. Internet facilities /Broadband has been installed. An EDUSAT facilities connected with main hub at Srinagar has been made functional.

For e-governance of admissions, examinations and internet connectivity, the University of Kashmir has raised facility by erecting the towers and providing gadgetry support. Automation of library is in progress and shall be functional very soon. College website has been launched recently is being upgraded on daily basis.

Courses Offered 
1.      Bachelors Programme in Business Administration (6 Semester Course)

2.      Certificate Course in Retail Management – 50 Students

3.      Certificate Course in Int. Business Management – 50 Students

4.      Certificate Course in Tourism &  Hospitality  Management  –  50 Students

5.      Certificate Course in Information Technology – 50 Students.

6.      Bachelors of Commerce (6 Semester Course)

7.     Bachelors of Arts (6 Semester Course)

MOU’s Undertaken by the Deptt. of Management Studies 
1.     Tripartite MOU entered with Deptt. of Higher Education J&K Govt., University of Kashmir, SKUAST – K Shalimar for rolling out Skill Development Programme in our College.

2.     NASCOM Noida, Sector Skill Council for Curriculum Alignment, Assessment & Support for Skill Programme approved by UGC.

3.     Tourism Hospitality Sector Skill Council (THSC) for Curriculum Alignment, Assessment & Support for Skill Programme approved by UGC.

4.     Homemade & Apparel Designing Sector Skill  Council  for Curriculum Alignment,   Assessment  &   Support   for  Skill Programme approved by UGC.

5.     Retail Association Sector Skill Council for Curriculum Alignment, Assessment & Support for Skill Programme approved by UGC.

6.     NIELIT Srinagar for Training / Skill Development of Students on Basic Certificate Course in Computer, GST Tally Accounting.  

7.     MOU with JKEDI Pampore, New Gen Incubation Centre University of Kashmir Under Progress.

The college offers courses a wide range of courses, such as Arts, Sciences, Social Sciences, and Commerce and is affiliated with the University of Kashmir. It has also adding additional "add on" courses to their curriculum to meet the better meet the market needs for employed and self-employed works. The aim is to develop  "career and market-oriented" training that broaden the students skill set.

Noted archaeological find 
In 1990 a group of geology students studied soil strata with Dr. A.M. Dur and M.S. Lone and happened upon exposed elephant tusk in the village of Galandar in the Pulwama district.  Further excavation resulting in the find of an additional elephant tusk, skull and other fossils and remains which were examined by Dr. Mohammad Ismail Bhat at Kashmir University. Stone tools found in the area and the presence of percussion marks on the elephant skull indicate that the elephant was killed by humans with primitive tools. The remains are considered to be at least 50,000 years old and may be as much as 10 million years old. The remains are the first clear evidence that there may have been human in South Asia during the Paleolithic age.

Notable alumni

 Engineer Rashid (MLA Langate)

See also

 Central Board of Secondary Education
 Education in India
 Government Higher Secondary Institute Botingoo
 Indian Certificate of Secondary Education
 University of Kashmir
 National Institute of Technology, Srinagar

References

External links 
 Sopore College Students Union (SCSU)

Sopore
Schools in Sopore
Universities and colleges in Jammu and Kashmir
Educational institutions established in 1951
Degree colleges in Kashmir Division